A number of Latin terms are used in legal terminology and legal maxims. This is a partial list of these terms, which are wholly or substantially drawn from Latin.



Common law

Civil law

Ecclesiastical law

See also
 Brocard (law)
 Byzantine law
 Code of Hammurabi
 Corpus Juris Canonici
 International Roman Law Moot Court
 Law French
 List of Latin abbreviations
 List of Latin phrases (full)
 List of fallacies
 List of Philippine legal terms
 List of Roman laws
 Twelve Tables

Notes

References
 Gabriel Adeleye & Kofi Acquah-Dadzie. World Dictionary of Foreign Expressions: A Resource for Readers and Writers. Ed. by Thomas J. Sienkewicz & James T. McDonough, Jr. Wauconda, Ill.: Bolchazy-Carducci Publishers, 1999.
 Ruben E. Agpalo. Agpalo’s Legal Words and Phrases. Manila, Philippines: Rex Book Store, 1997.
 Harold Rudolf Walraven Gokkel & Nicolaas van der Wal. Juridisch Latijn, 6th edn. Deventer: Kluwer, 2001.
 V.G. Hiemstra & H.L. Gonin. Trilingual Legal Dictionary, 3rd edn. Cape Town, South Africa: Juta, 2001.
 William Allen Jowitt. Jowitt’s Dictionary of English Law, 2nd edn. Revised by John Burke, Clifford Walsh, & Emlyn Williams. 2 vols. London: Sweet & Maxwell, 1977.
 Cezar C. Peralejo & Pacifico A. Agabin. English-Filipino Legal Dictionary. Quezon City, Philippines: Sentro ng Wikang Filipino, University of the Philippines, 1995.
 Theo B. Rood. Glossarium: A Compilation of Latin Words and Phrases Generally Used in Law with English Translations. Bryanston, South Africa: Proctrust Publications, 2003.
 Jan Scholtemeijer & Paul Hasse. Legal Latin: A Basic Course. Pretoria, South Africa: J.L. van Schaik Publishers, 1993.
 Datinder Sodhi & R. S. Vasan, eds. Latin Words & Phrases for Lawyers. New York: Law and Business Publications, 1980.
 Russ VerSteeg. Essential Latin for Lawyers. Durham, North Carolina: Carolina Academic Press, 1990.

 
Terms, Latin
Legal doctrines and principles
Articles containing Medieval Latin-language text